, son of Kujō Yukiie and Toyotomi Sadako. He was also adopted son of Nijō Akizane, was a Japanese kugyō (court noble) of the early Edo period. He held a regent position sesshō from 1635 to 1647. He married a daughter of Emperor Go-Yōzei, and the couple had son Nijō Mitsuhira.

References
 

1607 births
1666 deaths
Fujiwara clan
Yasumichi